Allison Williams (born January 18, 1984) is an American sportscaster with Fox Sports and formerly ESPN and former host for select pregame/postgame shows for Marlins Live. She did field reporting with play-by-play man Rich Waltz and color commentator Tommy Hutton.

Broadcasting career
Williams worked for Marlins Live for the Miami Marlins as a sideline reporter and host for pregame and postgame shows. She previously also did reporting for the Florida Panthers on home games with play-by-play man Steve Goldstein, Color Analyst Bill Lindsay, and Sportscaster Frank Forte. In addition, Williams also did sideline reporting for telecasts on college football and basketball for ESPN. Williams has hosted shows such as Miccosukee Sports Rap, The Jason Taylor Celebrity Golf Special, Ultimate Fan Experience, and other shows.

In October 2021, Williams announced that she would depart from ESPN, citing a COVID-19 vaccination mandate and her decision not to get the vaccine. Shortly after, Williams announced that she would be joining The Daily Wire, providing sports content.

Personal life
Williams grew up in Michigan and graduated from the University of Miami in 2006 with a degree in broadcast journalism.

References

External links

1984 births
Journalists from Michigan
University of Miami School of Communication alumni
Living people
Miami Marlins announcers
Florida Panthers announcers
Fox Sports 1 people
Place of birth missing (living people)
College basketball announcers in the United States
National Hockey League broadcasters
College football announcers
Major League Baseball broadcasters
American sports announcers
The Daily Wire people